The 2012 1. divisjon (women)  season kicked off on 14 April 2012, and ended on 28 October 2012.

2011-champions Vålerenga and runner-up Fart were promoted to the Toppserien at the end of the 2011 season. They were replaced by Medkila and Linderud-Grei. Haugar and Manglerud Star were relegated at the end of the 2011 season after finishing in the bottom two places of the table. They were replaced by the two playoff-winners Kongsvinger and Åsane.

Outcome 
At the end of the season the top team was to win promotion to Toppserien, the second team was to play off against the second from bottom team in Toppserien for promotion, while the bottom two teams were to be relegated to the 2. divisjon. In the event, Avaldsnes were champions and were promoted. Medkila came second, but lost the promotion playoff. However, the playoff winner, Kattem, subsequently withdrew their team, and Medkila were then promoted. Alta were offered the vacant place in the 2013 1. divisjon, but declined, opting for relegation. Voss were then offered the vacant place, and accepted it, thus avoiding relegation.

League table

Promotion play-offs
Medkila faced Kattem, who finished second last in Toppserien, in a two-legged play-off match for the right to play in the 2013 Toppserien. Kattem won the playoff, but subsequently withdrew their team from the league. Medkila were promoted to take their place in Toppserien.

See also 
2012 in Norwegian football
2012 Toppserien

References

2011
2
Norway
Norway